"Cutt Off" is the fourth single from Kasabian's eponymous album. It is Kasabian's second-highest UK Singles Chart entry at number eight. The single version was a re-working of the album version, featuring a new drum track, a different mix and slightly changed lyrics. The maxi CD features Kasabian's Radio 1 Live Lounge versions of their own "Processed Beats" and a cover of "Out of Space" by The Prodigy. The 10-inch vinyl version came in a poster bag, and featured the exclusive tracks "Pan Am Slit Scam" and a Mad Action remix of "Cutt Off".

Music video 
The official music video depicts people in a New York strete running from an unseen threat, which is revealed to be a giant flying shark, however the band are unfazed by it, with the shark flying around the members several times.

Track listings
Maxi CD
PARADISE26
 "Cutt Off" (Single Version) – 3:26
 "Processed Beats" (Live Lounge version)
 "Out Of Space" (Live Lounge version)
 CD-Rom with "Cutt Off" video and Movement Gallery print-off poster

Mini CD
PARADISE25
 "Cutt Off" (Single Version) – 3:26
 "Beneficial Herbs" (Demo) – 3:53

10-inch vinyl
PARADISE27
 "Cutt Off" (Single Version) – 3:26
 "Pan Am Slit Scam"
 "Cutt Off" (Mad Action Remix)

Personnel
Kasabian
 Tom Meighan – lead vocals
 Sergio Pizzorno – rhythm guitar, backing vocals, synths
 Christopher Karloff – lead guitar, synths, omnichord
 Chris Edwards – bass

Additional credits
 Daniel Ralph Martin – drums
 Ian Matthews – drums (single version only)

References

Kasabian songs
2004 songs
2005 singles
Columbia Records singles
Song recordings produced by Jim Abbiss
Songs written by Christopher Karloff
Songs written by Sergio Pizzorno